Onésime Carignan (October 16, 1839 – September 20, 1897) was a wholesale and retail grocer and political figure in Quebec. He represented Champlain in the House of Commons of Canada from 1891 to 1896 as a Conservative member.

He was born in Champlain, Quebec, the son of Joseph Carignan and Josephte Turcotte. In 1864, he married Aglaée Le Bel. Carignan served as a member of the town council for Trois-Rivières from 1876 to 1888.

References 

The Canadian parliamentary companion, 1891, AJ Gemmill

1839 births
1897 deaths
Members of the House of Commons of Canada from Quebec
Conservative Party of Canada (1867–1942) MPs